An eternal flame is a flame, lamp or torch that burns for an indefinite time. Most eternal flames are ignited and tended intentionally, but some are natural phenomena caused by natural gas leaks, peat fires and coal seam fires, all of which can be initially ignited by lightning, piezoelectricity or human activity, some of which have burned for hundreds or thousands of years.

In ancient times, eternal flames were fueled by wood or olive oil; modern examples usually use a piped supply of propane or natural gas. Human-created eternal flames most often commemorate a person or event of national significance, serve as a symbol of an enduring nature such as a religious belief, or a reminder of commitment to a common goal, such as diplomacy.

Religious and cultural significance
The eternal fire is a long-standing tradition in many cultures and religions. In ancient Iran the atar was tended by a dedicated priest and represented the concept of "divine sparks" or Amesha Spenta, as understood in Zoroastrianism. Period sources indicate that three "great fires" existed in the Achaemenid era of Persian history, which are collectively considered the earliest reference to the practice of creating ever-burning community fires.

The eternal flame was a component of the Jewish religious rituals performed in the Tabernacle and later in the Temple in Jerusalem, where a commandment required a fire to burn continuously upon the Outer Altar. Modern Judaism continues a similar tradition by having a sanctuary lamp, the ner tamid, always lit above the ark in the synagogue. After World War II, such flames gained further meaning, as a reminder of the six million Jews killed in the Holocaust.

The Cherokee Nation maintained a fire at the seat of government until ousted by the Indian Removal Act in 1830. At that time, embers from the last great council fire were carried west to the nation's new home in the Oklahoma Territory. The flame, maintained in Oklahoma, was carried back to the last seat of the Cherokee government at Red Clay State Park in south-eastern Tennessee, to the Museum of the Cherokee Indian in Cherokee, North Carolina, and to the Cherokee Nation Tribal Complex in Talequah, Oklahoma.

In China, it has at times been common to establish an eternally lit lamp as a visible aspect of ancestor veneration; it is set in front of a spirit tablet on the family's ancestral altar.

Extinguished flames
 One of the three "Great Flames" of the Achaemenid Empire was extinguished during the reign of Alexander the Great to honour the death of his close friend Hephaestion in 324 BC.
 The Hebrew Bible commands that "The fire shall ever be burning upon the altar; it shall never go out" (Leviticus 6:5, JPS, regarding the altar of Burnt Offering in the Tabernacle, and later the altars in Solomon's Temple and the Second Temple (the latter sacked by Rome in 70 AD). Many churches (especially Catholic, Anglican, and Lutheran), along with Jewish synagogues, feature an eternal flame on or hung above their altars (churches) or Torah arks (synagogues). 
 The Sacred fire of Vesta in Ancient Rome, which burned within the Temple of Vesta on the Roman Forum, was extinguished in 394 AD.
The sacred fire of the Celtic goddess Brigid burned at Kildare, Ireland in pagan times and the fire was continued when the site was Christianised by Saint Brigid in the 5th century AD. It continued burning until the 16th-century Dissolution of the Monasteries.
 The eternal flame near the Bronze Soldier of Tallinn in Estonia was extinguished after the country gained independence from the USSR in 1991.

 The eternal flame that was part of the East German "Memorial to the Victims of Fascism and Militarism" at Neue Wache in East Berlin was removed after the 1990 German reunification. In 1993, the space was redesigned without a flame and rededicated as the "Central Memorial of the Federal Republic of Germany for the Victims of War and Tyranny".
Llama de la Libertad lit by Augusto Pinochet in 1975 in to commemorate the 1973 Chilean coup d'etat against Salvador Allende. It was extinguished in 2004.
The flame was extinguished just months later, after the overthrow of Slobodan Milošević.
 A lighthouse-like memorial in the suburb of Eira in Helsinki, Finland was originally erected in honour of the Finnish seamen and seafaring. It later became a symbol of those who have perished at the sea, the Baltic Sea in particular. A minor controversy arose when the flame was temporarily extinguished, to conserve gas, technically meaning the flame was not an eternal one. It had been relit but in the middle 2010s, the city of Helsinki grew tired of having to relight the flame and decided to put it out for good.

Current man-made eternal flames

Europe

Belarus
 Minsk, at the Victory Square, lit in 1961
 Baranovichi, at the memorial of the fallen during the Great Patriotic War, lit in 1964.
 Brest, near the ruins of the Engineering Administration, lit in 1972.

Belgium
 Brussels, at the foot of the Congress Column, surmounting the Tomb of the Unknown Soldier.

Bosnia and Herzegovina

 Sarajevo, the Sarajevo eternal flame (Vječna vatra), in memory of the military and civilian victims of the Second World War

Bulgaria
 Sofia, at the Monument to the Unknown Soldier

Croatia
 Zagreb, in front of the Ministry of Internal Affairs in memory of the police officers killed in the Croatian War of Independence
 Sisak, in Dr. Franjo Tuđman Park, in front of city market and swimming pool, in memory of soldiers fallen in the Croatian War of Independence

France

 Paris, under the archway at the Arc de Triomphe, which has burned continuously since 1921, in memory of all who died in World War I.
 Arras, at the Notre Dame de Lorette war memorial.

Germany
 Berlin, at the Theodor-Heuss-Platz
 Munich, in the Square of the Victims of National Socialism (Platz der Opfer des Nationalsozialismus)

Hungary
 Budapest, in Kossuth Square, commemorating the revolutionaries of the 1956 uprising against control by the Soviet Union

Ireland
 Dublin at the junction of Amiens St and Memorial Road, the Universal Links on Human Rights by Amnesty International, honoring prisoners of conscience
 Kildare a perpetual flame burns in the town square. It was formerly housed, since 1993, at Solas Bhríde, a sanctuary run by the Catholic Brigidine sisters. The modern flame rekindles the original one burned by the sisters of Saint Brigit in Kildare, which was extinguished during the Dissolution of the Monasteries.
 New Ross at a new monument to Irish emigrants. On June 18, 2013, a torch from the eternal flame at the John F. Kennedy grave at Arlington National Cemetery was used to light this flame.

Italy
 Madonna del Ghisallo, near Lake Como, for all cyclists who have died
 Rome, on the Altare della Patria, for the Unknown Soldier

Latvia

Riga, at Brothers' Cemetery or Cemetery of the Brethren (Brāļu Kapi), a military cemetery and national monument memorializing thousands of Latvian soldiers who were killed between 1915 and 1920 in World War I and the Latvian War of Independence. The memorial was built between 1924 and 1936, and designed by sculptor Kārlis Zāle.

Lithuania
 Kaunas, at the Tomb of Unknown Soldier, in the Square of Unity in front of the Vytautas the Great War Museum.

Luxembourg
 Luxembourg, near the Place du Saint-Esprit, in memory of all Luxembourgers fallen in World War II.

Malta
 Floriana, inaugurated in 2012. Two eternal flames are placed beside the War Memorial, dedicated to all the Maltese dead of World War I and World War II.

Moldova
 Chișinău, a flame dedicated to Chișinău's unknown soldiers who died in World War II at the Eternity Memorial Complex.

Netherlands
 Amsterdam, at the Hollandsche Schouwburg, in memorial of the Dutch Jewish people who were killed in World War II
 Maastricht, at the Market Square, a statue of Jan Pieter Minckeleers, a Dutch scientist and inventor who discovered illuminating gas (coal gas) and was the inventor of gas lighting.
 The Hague, at the Peace Palace, dedicated to the idea of international peace
 Oosterbeek, at the Airborne Museum Hartenstein, in memorial to those who died in the Battle of Arnhem during Operation Market Garden

Norway
 Oslo, inaugurated on June 9, 2001 at The Pier of Honour, Port of Oslo by Sri Chinmoy and installed permanently at the Aker Brygge complex in 2002. By 2013 however, it was removed from Aker Brygge and reinstalled at Holmenkollen.

Poland
 Warsaw, at the Tomb of the Unknown Soldier

Portugal
 Batalha, at the Tomb of the Unknown Soldier (inside the Batalha Monastery), honoring the Portuguese dead in the World War I, lit April 6, 1921
 Lisbon, at the Monument to the Overseas War Combatants, honoring the dead in the Portuguese Overseas War, lit January 15, 1994

Russia

 Moscow, at the Tomb of the Unknown Soldier in the Alexander Garden to honor the dead of the Great Patriotic War. A second one at Victory Park, also built to honor the dead.
 Saint Petersburg has three sites with eternal flames. The first is at the Monument to the Fighters of the Revolution, on the Field of Mars, in memory of those who died during the Bolshevik Revolution. The second is at Piskaryovskoye Memorial Cemetery in memory of those who perished in World War II during the Siege of Leningrad. At Victory Square, several flames can be seen at the Monument to the Heroic Defenders of Leningrad, in commemoration of the victims and survivors of the Siege of Leningrad. 
 Volgograd has two eternal flames. The first is located at Mamayev Kurgan in the Hall of the Warrior Glory in tribute to all those who died defending the city from 1942 to 1943. The second is located at The Square of the Fallen Fighters on the monument of those who died defending in the Civil and Great Patriotic War
 Kursk has two eternal flames. One is located at the war memorial and the other close to the Triumphal Arch.
 Saratov has two eternal flames: in the Theatre Square and in the Victory Park
 Tambov
 Novokuznetsk has an eternal flame at the Heroes Boulevard
 Tolyatti, at the Obelisk of Glory, lit in 1978
 Samara, at the Obelisk of Glory
 Tver has an obelisk and an eternal flame nearby, located on Ploschad Pobedy near the confluence of the rivers T'maka and Volga, to honor the Soviet soldiers who fought against Nazi Germany in the Great Patriotic War (:ru:Великая Отечественная война)
 Yekaterinburg, on Kommunarov Square, where dead soldiers were buried in a common grave in 1919. An eternal flame was lit at the site in 1959.
 Omsk, an eternal fire was lit in 1967 on Memorial Square, in honour of fallen soldiers in World War II.
 Severodvinsk
 Ufa has two eternal flames. The first was lit in 1980 in Victory Park, honouring Alexander Matrosov and Minnigali Gubaidullin. The second was lit in 1967, honouring soldiers, who fell fighting for the Soviet Union.
 Salavat, opened in 1981. Honors Salavat citizens, who died during the Great Patriotic War.
 Arkhangelsk, in honor of fallen Northerners in 1941–1945
 Sterlitamak
 Biysk
 Bryansk
 Kovrov
 Kolchugino, located on Lenin Square
 Kaspyisk
 Mahachkala
 Kaliningrad
 Petrozavodsk
 Anapa
 Sochi
 Novy Urengoy
 Sergiyev Posad
 Vologda
 Tula
 Oryol, an eternal fire was lit in 1967 on Tankman's Square.
 Inozemtsevo

Serbia
 Belgrade, the Eternal Flame in the Park of Friendship in Ušće, in memory of the military and civilian victims of the NATO bombing of Yugoslavia

Spain
 Barcelona, Catalonia, at the Fossar de les Moreres (adjacent to the Basílica de Santa Maria del Mar), honouring the Catalans buried there, who died defending Barcelona from those loyal to Philip V on the siege of 1714. The torch with the eternal flame was inaugurated in 2001.
 Madrid, at the Plaza de la Lealtad. The Monumento a los Caídos por España honours all those who have died fighting for Spain. Following the COVID-19 pandemic, the Mayor of Madrid inaugurated on 15 May another eternal flame at Plaza de Cibeles, in memory of those who died during the pandemic.

Switzerland
 Näfels, at the St. Hilarius Parish Church, in atonement for a 14th-century murder.

Transnistria
 Tiraspol, a flame dedicated to losses of the War of Transnistria.

Ukraine

 Kyiv, in the Glory Park at the Glory Obelisk and the Tomb of the Unknown Soldier, honoring the dead of World War II.
 Chernihiv, in the Glory Memorial in the Boldina Gora'hill
 Vinnytsia, the Glory memorial.
 Odessa, a monument to the unknown sailor.

United Kingdom
 London, at the New Scotland Yard. The flame commemorates, as the inscription notes, "those who have lost their lives in the service of the Metropolitan Police".
 Liverpool, at the Anfield stadium, in memorial to those who died in the Hillsborough disaster

North America

Canada
 The Flame of Hope in London, Ontario, at 442 Adelaide Street, where Frederick Banting did theoretical work leading to the discovery of human insulin. It will remain lit until diabetes is cured. It was lit by Queen Elizabeth The Queen Mother in 1989.
 The Centennial Flame in Ottawa, Ontario, first lit in 1967, is in the spirit of an eternal flame; however, it is annually extinguished for cleaning and then relit. It commemorates the first hundred years of Canadian confederation.
 The Centennial Flame on the grounds of the Alberta Legislature Building in Edmonton, Alberta commemorates the same milestone as its counterpart in Ottawa. The flame burns from a metallic cauldron and is located south along the walkway from the south entrance of the Legislature between the south side of Legislature Building Road NW and Fortway Drive NW. Another eternal flame is located on the grounds of the Legislature honours those fallen in the line of duty working for the province.
 The Eternal Flame in the Peace Garden in Nathan Phillips Square in front of Toronto City Hall. It was lit by Pope John Paul II in September 1984 and symbolizes the hope and regeneration of humanity.
 The 2004 Olympic flame remains burning in a memorial park in the Greek town area of Toronto.

United States
 Alabama: Huntsville, Big Spring Park in honor of John F. Kennedy Ignited in 1976, the flame has been extinguished at times for years due to poor maintenance.
 California: Koyasan Buddhist Temple in Los Angeles, where the Peace Flame directly taken from the torch at the Hiroshima Peace Memorial Park in Japan is kept. The flame was brought to Los Angeles in 1989 by Mayor Tom Bradley and has been maintained by the resident priests ever since. University of California, Santa Barbara, houses an eternal flame on its campus in honor of Dr. Martin Luther King, Jr. Auburn, on the corner of Fulweiler St. and Nevada St. depicts a soldier carrying a fallen comrade. The statue is named 'Why'. Redlands, in Jennie Davis Park (corner of Redlands Blvd. and New York St.), at the Veterans' Memorial. La Mirada, in front of City Hall to honor the residents who have given their life for their country. Pico Rivera, in front of the civic center, to honor Pico Rivera veterans who died in the line of duty. 
 Connecticut: New Britain, at the National Iwo Jima Memorial to honor the memory of US servicemen who gave their lives at Iwo Jima.
 Florida: Jacksonville, at the Veterans Memorial Wall there is an eternal flame to honor those who served. Miami, at Bayfront Park on Biscayne Boulevard, is the Torch of Friendship for John F. Kennedy
 Georgia: Carrollton, at the main entrance of the University of West Georgia, lit at the beginning of each school year; Decatur, at the square downtown, for the Korean War, World War II, and the Vietnam War; Monroe, at the Monroe Historic Courthouse, to honor Walton County veterans; Savannah at the Chatham County Courthouse dedicated to the "Glory of God" and honors veterans, specifically Captain Willie O. Sasser, U.S. Air Force; Atlanta, at the King Center, for assassinated civil rights leader Martin Luther King Jr.
 Hawaii: Honolulu, to honor victims of the September 11 attacks
 Illinois: Chicago, at Daley Plaza, to honor those who perished in World War II, ignited August 22, 1972, by Albina Nance, president of the Illinois Gold Star Mothers. Highland Park, in the Freedom's Sacrifice veterans memorial located on the corner of St. John Ave and Central Avenue to remember the soldiers from Highland Park that gave their lives in the name of freedom. Naperville, on the city's Riverwalk to honor victims of September 11 attacks. Loves Park, in Holdridge Park on North Second Street to honor all veterans.

 Indiana: Highland, the Highland-Wicker Park Veterans Memorial in Wicker Park on Indianapolis Boulevard and Ridge Road, erected to honor all veterans.
 Louisiana: Saint Martinville, at the Acadian Memorial, symbolizing the survival of exiled Acadians as south Louisiana Cajuns.
 Maryland: Emmitsburg, at the National Fallen Firefighters Memorial, on the grounds of the National Fire Academy
 Massachusetts: Springfield, at Forest Park, John F. Kennedy Memorial Flame to honor the memory of President Kennedy. The flame was lit November 22, 1964 on the first anniversary of his death.
 Michigan: Farmington Hills, at the Holocaust Memorial Center in honor of those who perished during the Holocaust. Flint, in Downtown Flint, across from the Durant Hotel, to honor John F. Kennedy
 Mississippi: Mississippi State University, the eternal flame of education 
 Missouri: Downtown, Saint Louis, to commemorate the founding of the American Legion in 1919 by Theodore Roosevelt Jr.
 Nevada: Las Vegas, at the Allegiant Stadium and Las Vegas Raiders headquarters in Henderson to honor the late Oakland Raiders owner Al Davis.
 New York: New York City, at Ground Zero, lit by Mayor Michael Bloomberg on the first anniversary of the September 11 attacks upon the financial district of the city; St. Clare's Church, honoring 29 parishioners who died during the September 11 attacks. Lewiston Veteran's Circle of Honor Memorial, that reads, "America's flame burns brightly, fueled by the courage and sacrifice of those who have defended our freedoms."
 North Dakota: Grand Forks, at the University of North Dakota, Old Main Memorial Sphere erected on the site where the university's first building once stood.
 Ohio: Cincinnati at the National Underground Railroad Freedom Center Represents the candles that were placed in the windows of Underground Railroad Supporters. Canton, Garden Center, incorporated into the city's memorial to the memory of President John F. Kennedy, dedicated in 1966. Steubenville, at the Tomb of the Unborn Child, the gravesite of seven aborted fetuses, on the campus of the Franciscan University of Steubenville. Columbus, at Battelle Riverfront Park, to honor fallen members of the Columbus Fire Department. Clinton, at Ohio Veterans Memorial Park. The monument is made up of a large sitting area that is surrounded by benches, a four tier waterfall, a fifty foot wide pond, a black granite POW/MIA monument, an inverted Vietnam War helmet with the eternal flame and a cast steel POW/MIA seal. Mount Vernon, on the campus of Mount Vernon Nazarene University to honor the commitment to learning and the expansion of knowledge.
 Oklahoma: Oral Roberts University, Tulsa, atop the Prayer Tower, which represents the baptism of the Holy Spirit
 Pennsylvania: Gettysburg Battlefield, in memory of the dead of the American Civil War, first lit by President Franklin Roosevelt in 1938; Shanksville, to honor the crew and passengers aboard United Airlines Flight 93 on September 11 attacks in their efforts to thwart the hijacking. Washington Square, Philadelphia, site of the city's Tomb of the Unknown Soldier of the American Revolution and above the mass grave of thousands of Revolutionary War soldiers.
 South Carolina: Bowman, lit in 1987 in honor and memory of the community's residents who died in World War I, World War II, and the Vietnam War
 South Dakota: Pierre, at the Flaming Fountain (Veterans) Memorial on the shores of Capitol Lake. The flame is part of a fountain.
Tennessee: The Cherokee maintained a fire at their seat of government, and carried coals to the Oklahoma Territory. Coals from that fire were used to relight the eternal flame at Red Clay State Park, the last seat of the independent Cherokee Nation.  The Cherokee People Eternal Flame, located on the Qualla Boundary in Cherokee, North Carolina, is another example of a flame first lit on the Oklahoma Cherokee Reservation and carried as hot coals back to the homeland. Memphis, at the grave of Elvis Presley at his home Graceland
 Virginia: John F. Kennedy Eternal Flame in Arlington National Cemetery, lit by Jacqueline Kennedy on November 25, 1963, during the assassinated president's state funeral; Newport News Victory Arch, commemorating American servicemen and women.; Huntington Park (Newport News) Vietnam Veterans War Memorial dedicated in 1992; Lynchburg, gravesite of Jerry Falwell at Liberty University
 Washington, D.C.: at the United States Holocaust Memorial Museum, first lit in 1993 by President Bill Clinton and noted Holocaust survivor Elie Wiesel

Mexico
 The Column of Independence, México City in memory of the heroes of the Mexican Independence War

Nicaragua
 Tomb of Carlos Fonseca in the Central Park of Managua.

South America

[[File:Panteão da Pátria Tancredo Neves.jpg|thumb|The Pantheon of Fatherland and Freedom, Tancredo Neves, in Brasília]]

Argentina
 In the Buenos Aires Metropolitan Cathedral in the Autonomous City of Buenos Aires. It was lit on August 17, 1947 to honor the tomb of General José de San Martín, whose remains rest inside it; and the soldiers who fought and perished in the wars for Argentina, Chile and Perú's independence from the Spanish crown.
 In the National Flag Memorial (Argentina) in Rosario, Santa Fe.
 In the 'Monument to the dead of the Malvinas War' (Caidos en Malvinas) in Mar del Plata, Buenos Aires.

Brazil
 In the Independence Park, São Paulo, the Pira da Liberdade marks the site of the independence of Brazil
 Outside the Pantheon of Fatherland and Freedom, Tancredo Neves, Brasília, on top of a tower built on the diagonal, burns an eternal flame which represents the freedom of the people and the country's independence.
 In São Sepé, central region of the state of Rio Grande do Sul, Boqueirão Ranch has a shed that houses a fire that has been lit since the shed was built in 1800. The Simões Pires family, in its sixth generation, currently maintains the bonfire still lit today.

Chile

 The Llama de la Libertad, which commemorated the 1973 Chilean coup d'état. It was extinguished in 2004 due to budget cuts.
 In Punta Arenas, to commemorate the heroes of the Battle of La Concepción. It was extinguished in 2013 due to natural gas shortages.

Colombia
 In the Battle of Boyacá Memorial in Boyacá.

Venezuela
 In the Battle of Carabobo Memorial in Carabobo.

Australia

 In the ANZAC War Memorial, Hyde Park in Sydney
 In the Shrine of Remembrance in Melbourne
 In the Shrine of Remembrance in ANZAC Square in Brisbane, Queensland
 At the Australian War Memorial, Canberra, Australian Capital Territory
 At the state War Memorial in Kings Park, Western Australia
 In the Carillon War Memorial located at Bathurst, New South Wales
At the Anzac Memorial, ANZAC Park, Townsville

Asia

Armenia
 Yerevan, in the center of the Armenian Genocide Memorial

Azerbaijan
 Baku, at the Martyrs' Lane in memory of the military and civilian victims of the Black January and the Nagorno-Karabakh conflict
 Ateshgah of Baku
Bangladesh
 Dhaka, at the Swadhinata Stambha commentating the martyrs of the Bangladesh Liberation War and the precise location of the signing of the Instrument of Surrender.

Georgia
 Tbilisi, at the roundabout and underpass of Hero's Square

India

 Raj Ghat, New Delhi, Delhi, in memory of Mahatma Gandhi at the site of his cremation. The date that the flame was first lit is unknown.
 Amar Jawan Jyoti, New Delhi, at the India Gate, first lit in 1971 to honor 90,000 soldiers who died in World War I and later conflicts. On 21 January 2022, the eternal flame was merged with an eternal flame at the National War Memorial.
 Kargil War Memorial, Dras, Ladakh, the eternal flame was lit to commemorate the Indian victory in the 1999 Kargil War and to pay homage to martyrs.
 Port Blair, Andaman and Nicobar Islands, to remember the victims of the 2004 Asian tsunami, unveiled in 2005
 Dwarka Mai Mosque, Shirdi, Maharashtra, lit by Sai Baba of Shirdi in the late 1800s
 Some ancient temples in South India are known to have eternal flames which have burnt for centuries. Most established temples (such as Venkateswara Temple, Mantralayam, etc.) have eternal flames.

Indonesia 
 Api Abadi Mrapen (Mrapen Eternal Fire), Grobogan, Central Java source of some remarkable events such as GANEFO, but it was permanently die out due to lack of gas sources. 
 Api Abadi Sungai Siring (Siring River Eternal Fire), Samarinda, East Borneo
 Ijen Blue Fire, Ijen, Banyuwangi, East Java
 Api Kayangan Abadi (Kayangan Eternal Fire), Bojonegoro, East Java. This site have eternal flame since the era of Majapahit
 Api Abadi Bekucuk (Bekucuk Eternal Fire), East Java
 Tugu Api Semangat Indonesia Tidak Pernah Padam (Monument of the Undying Spirit of Indonesia), at Jenderal Soedirman Building, Ministry of Defense (Indonesia)Central Jakarta, Jakarta.

Israel
 Tel Aviv, at Rabin Square, for assassinated Prime Minister Yitzhak Rabin
 In Jerusalem at Yad Vashem, the national Holocaust-Memorial of Israel
 Near Jerusalem at Yad Kennedy, Israel's memorial to U.S. President John F. Kennedy

Japan

 At the Buddhist temple Daishō-in, at Mt. Misen, Itsukushima, where the flame is said to have been burning since AD 806, for more than 1,200 years
 Hiroshima Peace Memorial Park, to remain lit until all nuclear weapons in the world are abolished

Kazakhstan
 Almaty, the Monument to the Unknown Soldier (from Soviet times)

Kyrgyzstan

 Bishkek, the Victory (Pobedy) Monument on Victory Square

Nepal
 Eternal Peace Flame Lumbini, birthplace of Gautama Buddha, since 1986.

Philippines

 Eternal Flame of Freedom in Corregidor
 Eternal Flame on the grave of former president Ferdinand Marcos in the Libingan ng mga Bayani in Taguig City

South Korea
 At the Peace Gate at Olympic Park, Seoul, South Korea

Turkmenistan
 Türkmenbaşy, the Victory Monument

Africa

Kenya
Nairobi, Kenya: The Eternal Flame of Uhuru Gardens
Ghana
 Accra, Ghana: The Eternal Flame of African Liberation

Zimbabwe
 Harare, Zimbabwe: An eternal flame burns atop the Kopje to commemorate independence.

South Africa
 Pretoria, South Africa: An eternal flame burns in the Voortrekker Monument, since 1938.
 Johannesburg, South Africa: The flame of democracy burns on Constitution Hill, since 2011.
 Cape Town, South Africa: The Flame of Remembrance for the fallen soldiers and heroes of the struggle burns at the Parliament

Caribbean

Trinidad and Tobago
 Port of Spain: At The Red House, in memory of the lives lost in the 1990 attempted coup

Cuba
 Havana: Memorial to the Soviet Internationalist Soldier
 Havana: Museum of the Revolution in the Granma complex
 Santa Clara: Inside the Che Guevara Mausoleum
 Santa Clara: In the cemetery beside the Che Guevara Mausoleum complex

Naturally fueled flames

Fueled by natural gas
 At Yanartaş in the Olympos National Park in Turkey, natural gas burns from many vents on the side of the mountain. It is thought to be the location of ancient Mount Chimaera. This is the largest venting of possibly abiogenic methane on Earth's terrestrial surface, and has been burning for over 2500 years. The flames were used in ancient times as a navigation beacon.
 The Eternal Flame Falls, featuring a small natural gas-fueled flame that burns behind a waterfall, can be found in Chestnut Ridge Park in Western New York, United States.
 There is an eternal flame in Guanziling, Taiwan, as a result of methane gas.
 Flaming Geyser State Park in Washington, United States.
 An area in India's Great Himalayas, worshiped by Hindus as Jwala Devi'' Temple, or Jwalamukhi Devi Temple in Himachal Pradesh produces natural spontaneous flames and is said to have been doing so for thousands of years.
 The Darvaza gas crater fire, near Derweze, Turkmenistan, is a large hole leaking natural gas that has been burning since 1971.
 An eternal flame near Kirkuk, Iraq, known to the locals as Baba Gurgur, is said to have been burning for thousands of years.
 An eternal flame is found at the Yanar Dag mud volcano in Azerbaijan.
 In the Central Javanese village of Manggarmas in Indonesia, the Mrapen is a famous natural gas-fueled eternal flame originally ignited sometime before the 15th century era of the Demak Sultanate. Before September 2020, it had never died out despite intense tropical rain and winds. It is said that the sacred kris heirloom dagger of Demak Sultanate was forged in this flame. The Mrapen flame, considered sacred in Javanese culture, is used in an annual Waisak Buddhist ceremony, brought to Mendut and Borobudur temple. It was also used in several torch relays for sport events such as Pekan Olahraga Nasional held every four years, 1997 Southeast Asian Games, 2008 Asian Beach Games, 2011 Southeast Asian Games, and 2018 Asian Games.
 Deep in the Himalayas of Nepal in Jomsom, a flame is said to be burning for thousands of years in one of the most sacred Hindu temples of world called Muktinath.
 In Murchison, New Zealand, a natural flame has been burning in the forest since it was lit by hunters in 1922. Access is facilitated by a tour company that serves tea and pancakes cooked on the fire.

Fueled by coal seams
 A coal seam-fueled eternal flame in Australia known as "Burning Mountain" is claimed to be the world's longest burning fire, at 6,000 years old.
 A coal mine fire in Centralia, Pennsylvania, has been burning beneath the borough since 1962.
 A coal field fire in Jharia, Jharkhand, India, is known to have been burning for almost a century.
 The Laurel Run mine fire started burning in 1915.
 The New Straitsville mine fire started burning in 1884.

See also
 Fire worship
 Longest-lasting light bulbs
 Sanctuary lamp
 Olympic flame
 Perpetual stew

References

External links

 
Types of monuments and memorials
Indo-European religion